Nell of the Circus is a 1914 four-act drama film written, directed by, and starring actress Cecil Spooner. The film was based on a play Spooner had frequently starred in, in New York, called Polly of the Circus. The film is thought to be lost.

Plot 
Nell of the Circus centers around a forbidden marriage between a wealthy heiress with a circus performer, and their daughter, Nell.

Cast 

 Cecil Spooner as Nell
 Richard Garrick (role unknown)

References 

1914 films
Silent films